New Hampshire Route 145 (abbreviated NH 145) is a  north–south state highway in northern Coös County in the Great North Woods Region of New Hampshire. The highway runs between intersections with U.S. Route 3 (US 3) in Colebrook and Pittsburg, taking a more direct route than US 3, which closely follows the Connecticut River and takes a longer, more circuitous route between the two towns.  NH 145 serves the towns of Stewartstown and Clarksville.

Route description
NH 145 begins at US 3 (Main Street) just north of the U.S. Highway's bridge across the Mohawk River in the town center of Colebrook. The two-lane highway heads northeast out of the town center along Park Street. NH 145 follows Beaver Brook and its North Branch, passing Beaver Brook Falls Wayside, to its headwaters at Stewartstown Hollow in the town of Stewartstown, where the route follows Hollow Road. A New Hampshire historical marker there (number 47) notes the nearby gravesite of Metallak, "The Lone Indian of the Magalloway". The highway descends to Cedar Brook and crosses Bishop Brook before ascending out of that valley and entering the town of Clarksville. NH 145 crosses Pond Brook, passes another historical marker (number 155) denoting the 45th parallel north, and passes through the village of Clarksville. North of there, the highway descends to and crosses the Connecticut River into the town of Pittsburg. There, NH 145 follows Mill Street a short distance to its northern terminus at US 3 (Main Street).

Major intersections

References

External links
 New Hampshire State Route 145 on Flickr

145
Transportation in Coös County, New Hampshire